Kent 4 was an English Rugby Union league that was the fourth tier for clubs in south-east London and Kent.  Promoted teams went up to Kent 3 and there was no relegation.  Initially created in 1987 the league ran for ten seasons before being cancelled at the end of the 1996–97 season.  Kent 4 was brought back in 2000 but after just one season, the six team division folded for the second time and all teams were automatically promoted to Kent 3.

Original teams

When league rugby began in 1987 this division contained the following teams:

Darenth Valley
East Peckham
Edenbridge
Footscray
Lordswood
Old Olavians
Old Williamsonians
University of Kent
Whitstable

Kent 4 Honours

Number of league titles

Orpington (3)
Bexley (1)
Citizens (1)
Darenth Valley (1)
Edenbridge (1)
Lordswood (1)
Old Olavians (1)
Old Williamsonians (1)
Vigo (1)

Notes

See also
London & SE Division RFU
Kent RFU
English rugby union system
Rugby union in England

References

Defunct rugby union leagues in England
Rugby union in Kent